Tulehu United Football Club is an Indonesian professional football club based in Tulehu, Central Maluku Regency, Maluku, that competes in Liga 3. They play their home match at Matawaru Field.

References

Central Maluku Regency
Football clubs in Maluku (province)
Football clubs in Indonesia
Association football clubs established in 2021
2021 establishments in Indonesia